João Capucho (23 October 1916 – 5 October 1998) was a Portuguese sailor. He competed in the Dragon event at the 1948 Summer Olympics.

References

External links
 

1916 births
1998 deaths
Portuguese male sailors (sport)
Olympic sailors of Portugal
Sailors at the 1948 Summer Olympics – Dragon
Sportspeople from Lisbon